The Commonwealth Council for Educational Administration and Management (CCEAM) is affiliated to the Commonwealth Consortium for Education (CCfE) established in 1970. It is a part of Commonwealth Family.

History 
CCEAM came into existence as the Commonwealth Council of Educational Administration (CCEA) in 1970 at the University of New England, Australia.

Affiliates

Asia 
India

India has 7 chapters, as following:

 Assam – ACEAM
 Gujarat – GCEAM
 Kerala – KCEAM
 Maharashtra –MCEAM
 Nagpur – NCEAM
 Rajasthan – RCEAM
 Uttar Pradesh – UCEAM

Malaysia

 Malaysian Society for Educational Administration and Management

Pacific 
New Zealand

Papua New Guinea

Tonga

Europe 
Malta

United Kingdom

Caribbean and Americas 
Barbados

Canada

Jamaica

Trinidad and Tobago

St Vincents and Grenadines

East and West Africa 
Cameroon

Kenya

Nigeria

Seychelles

Uganda

Southern Africa 
Namibia

South Africa

United Republic of Tanzania

References

External links 
 CCEAM Official website

1970 establishments in Australia
Commonwealth Family